Henry Geldzahler (1964) is a feature-length underground film directed by Andy Warhol, featuring art curator Henry Geldzahler smoking a cigar and becoming increasingly uncomfortable for 97 minutes. The film was shot silent and in black-and-white in the first week of July 1964, using unused film left from the filming of Empire.

See also
List of American films of 1964
Andy Warhol filmography

References

External links
Henry Geldzahler at WarholStars

1964 films
Films directed by Andy Warhol
1960s English-language films
1960s American films